The 1991 Philippine Basketball Association (PBA) rookie draft was an event at which teams drafted players from the amateur ranks. The annual rookie draft was held on January 15, 1991, at The ULTRA.

Round 1

Round 2

Notes
Purefoods owns the first pick, Alaska traded Elmer Reyes (who was acquired from Sarsi) in exchange to get the number one overall pick.
Presto traded Manny Victorino to Pepsi to acquire the number two overall pick.

References

Philippine Basketball Association draft
draft